The Tallaght Outlaws were an American football located in Tallaght, Ireland. The club was initially established in 2006 as a flag football team, before joining the Irish American Football League (IAFL) in 2007 where it competed for two seasons. The club folded following the conclusion of the 2008 season, as one of the only IAFL teams in history not to win a single game.

History

2007

Preseason
The preseason started with optimism with the hiring of American coach Ryan Andersen.  His arrival in November 2006 was to signify a change in direction for the Outlaws. Morale was at an all-time high with the additions of import players Henrik Olindersson from Sweden.  Henrik had previous experience playing for Coach Andersen with the Goteborg Mustangs and Carinthian Cowboys.

Belfast Bulls
24 Outlaws made the trip north to face 2005 IAFL runners-up, the Belfast Bulls.  On film the teams looked evenly matched.  Training leading up to the match the Outlaws gave the young squad confidence, leading to their first game experience of the season, and for many of them their careers.  But the optimism disappeared as soon as the team arrived.

The field was 3 inches of mud, and caused serious problems for the Outlaws' shotgun attack.  Several bad snaps led to a safety and poor field position.  The Bulls were able to move the ball effectively on the ground as the young Outlaws inexperience became obvious with poor tackling.  Highlights for the Outlaws include a 90-yard+ kickoff return by phenom Ritchie Whelon which set up a short touchdown pass from Olindersson to star WR Dave O'Neill.  Henrik also provided the play of the day defensively as he single-handedly shut down a Bulls option attempt by forcing the QB to pitch and tackling the pitchman.

When the last whistle blew, the final score showed 24–6 in favor of the home team.

Limerick Vikings
Limerick went into the season as the IAFL Southern Division favorites having lost the Shamrock Bowl the year before.  They showed this power early and often as they completely ran over the young Outlaws.  Snap problems again led to another safety, followed up by a return on the ensuing kickoff the Vikings were out to an early lead.  At times the Outlaws were able to move the ball through the air, but it was not enough as turnovers and poor tackling led to a 56–0 outcome.

Carrickfergus Knights
Game 2 saw the debut of the newest Outlaw, Canadian Joe Sullivan.  Joe brought in much needed experience and spark.  Spirits were high for the first home game of the year against a Knights team that did not travel with their full complement of players.  The Outlaws were able to move the ball on the ground effectively, but red zone difficulties kept the 0 on the score board.  The Knights combined a solid run game behind a veteran offensive line with an opportunistic passing game to put 19 points on the board.  Again the Outlaws were credited with their spirit and attitude, but with the final score of 19–0 they fell to 0–2 in the league.

Belfast Trojans
The Trojans came into their homegame with one of the most talented teams in the IAFL.  Behind the arm of an American QB, and the legs of IAFL legend "Voodoo" the young defense was going to have their hands full.  There were pluses for the Outlaws however as they had their best offensive output of the season thus far.  Joe Sullivan's relentless running combined with an improved passing game saw the Outlaws move the ball downfield and score their first touchdown of the season.  The special teams got into the scoring act as well by blocking a punt followed by a scoop and recovery by rookie LB Mike Stankard.  While the total of 12 points was an improvement, the inability to contain "Voodoo" led to a final score of 60–12 in favor of the Trojans.

Limerick Vikings
This game was a tale of 2 halves.  The first half the Outlaws came out on fire.  They were able to move the ball downfield against the heavily favored Vikings, and for the first time took the lead in a game.  The bend but don't break defense held off early Viking scoring attempts, and gave the young team a new sense of confidence.  As the half wore on the Vikings were able to finally found the endzone, twice in fact, and they entered the half with a 12–6 lead.  Having been down 30–0 at the half in the previous match the mood in the Outlaws lockerroom was high.  However, low numbers and high temperatures led to the Outlaws running out of gas shortly into the 2nd half.  Powerful runs, and long drives finally broke the young team, and the Vikings were able to leave Tallaght with a hard-fought 54–6 victory.

CMU Stags
The final score was 67–0 in favor of the American college team, but the score was not the important outcome of this match.  The undermanned Outlaws were able to organize a quality match for their visitors when no one else in the IAFL was up to the task.  The team and their coaches were able to take the match as a chance to see how the sport was supposed to be played.  Both teams had fun, and the fans in attendance were entertained. However, the Outlaws suffered several injuries as a result of the game and were forced to forfeit the rest of their fixtures that season.

The Outlaws went 0–8.

2008 
Tallaght went 0–8 for the second year in a row, scoring no points throughout the year whilst also conceding close to 500. The worst loss was to division rivals, the Cork Admirals, who beat Tallaght 98–0. The team shut down operations after the season.

Records

Player awards

External links
 IAFL official website

American football teams in the Republic of Ireland
American football teams in County Dublin
Tallaght
2007 establishments in Ireland
American football teams established in 2007
2008 disestablishments in Ireland
American football teams disestablished in 2008